Twisted Tales is an anthology horror comic book series.

Twisted Tales may also refer to:
Twisted Tales (TV series), a 1996 Australian anthology television series
Twisted Tales (British TV series), a 2005 British anthology television series
Twisted Tales (web series), a 2013 horror web series by Tom Holland
Twisted Tales, a set of books within the Horrible Histories franchise
A Twisted Tale, also called Twisted Tales, a series of young adult novels by several authors, published by Disney-Hyperion, each book asking what might happen if a key turning point in a Disney Animated Canon film occurred differently

See also
The Twisted Tales of Felix the Cat, a 1990s animated series starring Felix the Cat
The Twisted Tales of Spike McFang, an action role-playing video game for the Super Nintendo Entertainment System